The Pathfinder is a 1996 American television film based on the 1840 novel The Pathfinder, or The Inland Sea by James Fenimore Cooper. It stars Kevin Dillon as Pathfinder and Laurie Holden as Mabel Dunham.

The film is known as La Légende de Pathfinder in Canada (French title) and Le Lac Ontario in France.

Cast
 Kevin Dillon ... Pathfinder/Hawkeye
 Laurie Holden ... Mabel Dunham
 Graham Greene .... Chingachgook
 Stacy Keach ... Compte du Leon
 Russell Means ... Arrowhead
 Charles Edwin Powell ... Lt. Zale
 Charlotte Sullivan ... May
 Jaimz Woolvett ... Jasper Weston
 Christian Laurin ... Capt. Sanglier
 Ralph Kussman ... Guard on Ship

External links

1996 films
Films set in the 18th century
Films set in the Thirteen Colonies
Films based on American novels
Films based on works by James Fenimore Cooper
French and Indian War films
American television films
Films directed by Donald Shebib
1990s English-language films